Myślibórz (pronounced  ;) is a town in northwestern Poland, in West Pomeranian Voivodeship.  It is the capital of the Powiat of Myślibórz (powiat myśliborski), with a population of 11,867. It is home to the first monastery of the Congregation of Sisters of Merciful Jesus and a sanctuary of the Divine Mercy.

History

Middle Ages

The city's official webpage mentions a settlement inhabited by a pre-Slavic population from Lusatian culture on the shores of the lake (Polish: Jezioro Myśliborskie; German: Soldiner See) in the 7th century, which later turned into a West Slavic or Lechitic fortress in the 10th and 11th centuries; the area was incorporated into Poland by the Piast duke Mieszko I by the end of the 10th century. According to the city's webpage, the town site was a fishing settlement called Sołtyń, located on trading route between Silesia and Greater Poland towards Oder delta. It is from this fishing settlement that the later German name of the town comes: Soldin.

The site was acquired as a rest house by the Dominican Order in 1234, while the fort was granted to the Knights Templar by Duke Władysław Odonic and finally sold to the Ascanian margraves Johann I and Otto III of Brandenburg in 1261. Together with the nearby castellany of Santok, the former Greater Polish lands were incorporated into the Brandenburgian Neumark ("New March") territory. The town was first mentioned as Soldin in a 1270 deed and quickly became the administrative centre of the region, a Dominican monastery was founded there in 1275. However, in the first half of the 14th century Soldin declined due to famine and political strife of the Ascanian dynasty, in the course of which the Soldin Castle was destroyed.

In 1373 the New March became part of the Lands of the Bohemian Crown (or Czech Lands), ruled by the Luxembourg dynasty. In 1402, the Luxembourgs reached an agreement with Poland in Kraków. Poland was to buy and re-incorporate the region, but eventually the Luxembourgs sold it to the Teutonic Order. During the Polish–Teutonic War, in 1433 the town was destroyed by the Hussites. In 1455 the Teutonic Knights sold the town to the Margraviate of Brandenburg, now under the rule of the House of Hohenzollern, in order to raise funds for another war with Poland. Elector Frederick Irontooth had Brandenburg's suzerainty over the area formalized in the 1466 Treaty of Soldin with the Pomeranian dukes (see below). In 1473 the town was briefly captured by Bogislaw X, Duke of Pomerania.

Modern era

In the 16th century, Margrave Johann of Brandenburg-Küstrin converted the Neumark to Protestantism, seceded from Brandenburg and transferred his court from Soldin to Küstrin (now Kostrzyn nad Odrą, Poland). The Dominican monastery was dissolved. Soldin suffered heavy damage in the Thirty Years War, when it was overrun by the Imperial army under Albrecht von Wallenstein marching against King Christian IV of Denmark. It began to recover only in the 18th century as a garrison town of the Kingdom of Prussia under Frederick the Great. When the German Empire was formed in 1871, Soldin was the capital of a rural district (Landkreis) within the Prussian Province of Brandenburg. In the 19th century, Soldin was largely bypassed by the industrial revolution, and was not served by rail until 1888. Electrification came in 1898, and a municipal water system only in 1912. In the nearby forest, the Lituanica plane crash occurred on 17 July 1933.

By the beginning of the Second World War in 1939, Soldin had 6,284 inhabitants. The city was captured without a fight by the Red Army on 31 January 1945. After a Soviet soldier attempting to rape a local woman was shot and killed by her husband on 3 February, the Soviets rounded up 160 civilians from the town, mostly teenaged boys and elderly men, and murdered 120 of them in a nearby quarry four days later. After the discovery of the mass grave of the victims in 1995, a memorial commemorating the victims was erected.

With the end of the war in 1945, the partly depopulated area was transferred to Poland under border changes promulgated at the Potsdam Conference. The surviving German population of Soldin was forcibly expelled and the town, renamed Myślibórz, was gradually repopulated by Polish settlers. It was a powiat centre initially in Szczecin Voivodeship (1945-1975), then in Gorzów one (1975-1998), finally in West Pomeranian one since 31 December 1998.

Historically, the town was the site of two important treaties: The Treaty of Soldin (1309) between the Margraviate of Brandenburg and the Teutonic Order State, and the Treaty of Soldin (1466) between the Electorate of Brandenburg and the Duchy of Pomerania.

Notable residents
 Friedrich Wilhelm von Dossow (1669-1758), Prussian field marshal
 August Piepenhagen (1791–1868) a German landscape painter
 Daniel Lessmann (1794–1831), German-Jewish historian and poet. 
 Hermann Kennemann (1815–1910) a Prussian politician and landowner, co-founder of the German Eastern Marches Society
 Anna Schepeler-Lette (1829–1897) a German politician, feminist and women's social reformer. 
 Heino Schmieden (1835–1913) a German architect
 Max Fesca (1846–1917) a German specialist in agricultural science and agronomy
 William C. Rauschenberger (1855–1918), German-American mayor of Milwaukee
 Gisela Kallenbach (born 1944) a German politician, MEP for Alliance '90/The Greens,
 Jan Grabowski (1950–2017) a Polish speedway rider
 Adam Ostolski (born November 8, 1978) a Polish politician, activist and sociologist.
 Adam Hrycaniuk (born March 15, 1984) a Polish basketball player for Stelmet Zielona Góra of the Polish Basketball League.

International relations

Twin towns — sister cities
Myślibórz is twinned with:
 Kaunas, Lithuania
 Neuhardenberg, Germany
 Soltau, Germany

Sources

External links

Official town website
Unofficial town website
Virtual Mysliborz
Location via Encarta Maps 

Cities and towns in West Pomeranian Voivodeship
Myślibórz County